Chandreshwar Prasad Singh also known as C.P. Singh (born 16 January 1956) is an Indian Politician and a prominent leader of Bharatiya Janata Party, he has served as Minister of Urban Development, Transport, Parliamentary Affairs, Registration, Housing, Disaster Management & Civil Aviation in the Govt. of Jharkhand and was also Chairman of Jharkhand Legislative Assembly i.e. ‘Speaker’ from 2010-2013. He is member of Jharkhand legislative assembly from Capital City Ranchi for over decades, and is elected six times in a row since 1996, more than any other BJP leader of Jharkhand.

Early life and education

C.P. Singh was born to Rajeshwari Devi and Jaimohan Singh in Naugarha Village in district Palamu, Jharkhand. Born in a farmer family, He received his early education in Naugarha village till class 7th. After then, he moved to Ranchi for further education. He completed his secondary and higher secondary schooling from Marwari School. He got his graduation from Ranchi University in 1978 and enrolled in Chota Nagpur Law College. After accomplishing his law degree in 1982, he practiced law for 2 years.

Early political life

During his graduation, he became a member of Akhil Bharatiya Vidhyarthi Parisad (known as ABVP) in 1973 and was aggressively involved in student movement during Indira Gandhi regime. Being district head of AVBP from 1973 to 1976, CP Singh led student protest against Congress government in JP movement and went to prison. He was kept in Hazaribagh jail from January 1976 to July 1976. Although he missed his final graduation examination, but still he considers his participation is one of his remarkable contributions towards country and in politics.

He joined Janta Party in 1978 but when Janta party got divided, he joined Bharatiya Janta Party in 1980. In his early tenure he served in youth wing of Bharatiya Janta Party and held key positions within party like Ranchi District president and vice president of Youth Bharatiya Janta Yuva Morcha in Bihar from 1982 till 1996. He had been deeply engaged by Bharatiya Janta Party in electoral politics of Jharkhand.

Political career and image

C.P. Singh is six consecutive term member of legislative assembly. He was elected as MLA from Ranchi in years 1996, 2000, 2005, 2009, 2014 and 2019. In legislative assembly, he held some of the vital places as member of government and as member of opposition. From 2000 to 2006, he was ‘Chief Whip’ of ruling party and from 2006 to 2009, he was Chief Whip of opposition party. In January 2010, he was elected as 4th Speaker of Legislative Assembly of Jharkhand, a constitutional position.

Till today being an MLA for sixth consecutive term, Mr. Singh is always accessible to people of his constituency and picks calls himself and at any hour and his number is public for the very reason so that people could connect to him directly. His residence is open for all 24/7, each and every day for the past 26 years he conducts "Janta Darbaar" at his residence for people of his constituency and others so that he could address grievances of people coming from all across. His supporters proudly say, this is one among many reasons people of Ranchi have chosen him for sixth time despite many hurdles thrown by opposition parties.

Awards & Recognition

Jharkhand stood first in 2018 in Swacchta Survekshan and for the same award was given by Hon'ble PM Shri Narendra Modi to C.P. Singh.
Jharkhand was awarded as the 2nd best state in cleanliness in 2019 and this time award was given by his excellency President Shri Ram Nath Kovind to the responsible Minister.
Ranchi stood first in the category of best city in cleanliness (public feedback) and the award was given by Hon'ble Minister Hardeep Puri to Mr. Singh.

Limca Book of World Records recognized efforts of C.P. Singh and therefore conferred award for Public Grievance Management System. When he received the prestigious award, "Jansewa Portal" was the only portal all across India to be started by Mr. Singh as an MLA to register complaints of citizens online and to set up a volunteer based grievance redressal system so that complainants could actually track status of their complaints on real time basis 24/7.

Fame India Magazine conferred C.P. Singh award of 'Best Minister' from Jharkhand across India and the award was given by Hon'ble Union Minister Shri Mahendra Nath Pandey.

References 

1956 births
Living people
People from Palamu district
Members of the Jharkhand Legislative Assembly
Speakers of the Jharkhand Legislative Assembly
Indians imprisoned during the Emergency (India)
Bharatiya Janata Party politicians from Jharkhand
Jharkhand MLAs 2014–2019
State cabinet ministers of Jharkhand
Politicians from Ranchi